Mi novia es un fantasma is a 1944 Argentine romantic comedy film directed by Francisco Múgica and starring Mirtha Legrand, Pepe Iglesias, and Nuri Montsé. At the 1945 Argentine Film Critics Association Awards Iglesias won the Silver Condor Award for Best Actor in a Comic Role for his performance in the film.

Cast
Pepe Iglesias 		
Mirtha Legrand 	
Nuri Montsé 		
Osvaldo Miranda 		
Benita Puértolas 	
Olga Casares Pearson 		
Lalo Malcolm 	
Susana Campos		
Vicente Rubino 		
Mario Giusti

References

External links
 

1944 films
1940s Spanish-language films
Argentine black-and-white films
Films directed by Francisco Múgica
Argentine romantic comedy films
1944 romantic comedy films
1940s comedy mystery films
1940s Argentine films